Abdelouahed Chakhsi (born 1 October 1986) is a Moroccan professional footballer currently playing for Moghreb Tétouan.

Career
In early February 2012, Chakhsi made the move to Europe, transferring from Moroccan club KAC Kénitra to Swiss side Lausanne-Sport. He made his debut on 19 February 2012 against Luzern in a Swiss Super League match that ended in a 0–0 draw.

References

External links
 
 
 Abdelouahed Chakhsi at Footballdatabase

1986 births
Living people
Moroccan footballers
Moroccan expatriate footballers
Expatriate footballers in Switzerland
Association football defenders
Raja CA players
Olympic Club de Safi players
KAC Kénitra players
Kawkab Marrakech players
Moghreb Tétouan players
AS FAR (football) players
FC Lausanne-Sport players
Swiss Super League players
Swiss Challenge League players
Botola players